The Reliant Regal is a small three-wheeled car and van that was manufactured from 1952 to 1973 by the Reliant Motor Company in Tamworth, England, replacing the earlier Reliant Regent three-wheeled cyclecar van which had its origins in a design bought by Reliant from the Raleigh Bicycle Company. As a three-wheeled vehicle having a lightweight (under 7 cwt, 355.6 kg) construction, under UK law it is considered a "tricycle" and can be driven on a full (class A) motorcycle licence. In 1962, with the release of the Reliant Regal 3/25, van and estate versions with a side-hinged rear door were marketed as the Reliant Supervan.

History 

Following the launch of the Mk I in 1953, the Regal passed through many revisions in a short period, with the "first generation" using the original wooden frame and discrete-panel bodywork design through to the 1961 Mk VI. The Mk II was introduced in 1954 with a mostly similar design to the Mk1, though it can be distinguished by an updated windshield. The Mk III was introduced in 1956 with a heavily updated design and featured an all-fibreglass body for the first time. This was followed by the Mk IV in 1958, the Mk V in 1959 and the Mk VI in 1960.

In 1962, Reliant introduced the Mk VII,
code named "TW7" (Three Wheeler 7). This version featured a new OHV Reliant engine (based on a reverse-engineered all-alloy version of the 803cc Standard SC engine used in the discontinued Standard Eight), a new steel chassis and bonded shell design for the body, fully updated visual styling, and was badged based on their number of wheels/bhp. The Regal 3/25, was sold from 1962 to 1968, with a 600cc engine produced 25 bhp (actually 598cc/24 bhp). In 1969, the Regal 3/30 was introduced with a 700cc engine that produced 30 bhp (actually 701cc / 29 bhp). The Regal 21E and Regal 21E 700 were also sold. The 21E version was fitted with 21 extras, which were otherwise available as optional extras to the standard car. These extras included a spot light, a fog light, chrome plated bumper over-riders, sun visors, an oil gauge, outer wheel trims and metallic paint. In 1973, the Regal was replaced by the Reliant Robin (code named "TW8").

Regals MkI–MkII had aluminium bodies and 747-cc side-valve engines. However, during the 1950s, the price of aluminium increased markedly across Europe. In response, Reliant developed an expertise in making panels of glass fibre which piece by piece replaced the aluminium panels, until the 1956 Mark 3 Regal featured a wholly glass fibre body.
Unlike Panhard, who responded to the increased cost of aluminium by substituting heavier steel panels, Reliant's choice of the glass fibre technology ensured that the Regal was able to retain its advantageous light weight, with the resulting ability to use smaller, lower powered and therefore cheaper and more economical engines. The Regal Mk VI was the last Regal to be powered by a side-valve engine, as by 1962 Reliant had developed their own all aluminium 600 cc OHV engine that was fitted into the new Regal 3/25.

The Regal 3/25 (TW7) version was introduced in October 1962 and was available as a saloon, van, estate and pickup. The estate version was essentially a van (and badged as a Supervan) but with rear side windows and fold down, removable rear seats. Unlike previous Regals, this no longer had a wooden frame and instead had a unitary construction body of reinforced fibreglass. Fibreglass was moulded in two major units (outer and inner) and then bonded together and bolted to a steel chassis. Meanwhile, on 25 April 1968, a year before BMC celebrated their 2,000,000th Mini, Reliant sales director T.H.Scott personally drove the 50,000th Regal 3/25 off the assembly line at Reliant's Tamworth plant.

A few months later, in August 1968, the 701 cc engine introduced in the Reliant Rebel the previous autumn found its way into the Regal.
For the three-wheeler, the compression ratio was lowered to 7.5:1, reducing the power to a claimed 29.5 bhp from the Rebel's 35 bhp. Nevertheless, this still represented a useful increase over the 26 bhp claimed for the 600 cc unit which the 701 replaced.

Gallery

In popular culture 

Reliant Regals and Robins enjoy something of a special place in British culture as symbols of British eccentricity.

An example of a Supervan III is the iconic yellow van belonging to Del Boy and Rodney Trotter in the long-running BBC sitcom Only Fools and Horses. Many people claim to own genuine screen used vans but very few have any proof. British boxer Ricky Hatton bought a replica Del Boy van in 2004 which the seller claimed was genuine but later proved false. Another van was sold for around £44,000 in 2007 by Peter Nelson, a Keswick dentist, who had displayed it for 10 years in his 'Cars Of the Stars' museum. This genuine prop was used in the "Batman and Robin" Christmas special and Mr. Nelson claimed to have more than recouped the purchase price by renting the vehicle back to the production company. The company was sold in 2011, along with the rest of the collection, to American collector Michael Dezer, to be added to his 'Dezer Collection' in Miami, Florida. This collection has since been moved to Orlando, where it is now called The Orlando Auto Museum.

There were several Reliant supervans used in filming. For Series 1 and most of Series 2 (up to and including "A Touch Of Glass"), a 1969 Reliant Supervan II was used - distinguished by its number plate APL 911H and much 'dirtier' appearance, with an off-white colour bonnet, stickers to the rear door and distinctive paint pattern to the front. After "A Touch Of Glass" a new van was sourced and can be seen in the Series 2 Christmas special "Diamonds Are For Heather". This van remained in use until after Series 3 where others were then used. All other Reliants used in the TV series were the 1972 or 1973 Supervan III, dated by the type tail lamps fitted. The biggest irony of the vehicles used for the series was the use of painted-on rust, which the fibreglass vehicles could not actually develop. The fins of last Regals were remodelled to be flatter to incorporate the flat topped bulky tail lamps. All previous Regals used round topped flush tail lights (Lucas L572). Action Cars, Telefilm Cars, and Cars of the Stars in Keswick, England would hire vans for filming over the course of the TV show's life.

The registration number of DHV 938D wasn't real and was just a show plate made for production. This plate indicates a vehicle registered in London in 1966, an impossibility as the van used is of the 1969–1973 models.

In another British TV comedy, Mr. Bean, a running gag involves the titular character played by British comedian Rowan Atkinson frequently coming into conflict with a light blue 1972 Reliant Supervan III, which gets tipped over, crashed into, or bumped out of its parking space. Two vans were used. The early van used in filming is easy to identify as it is light blue, has 2 chrome wing mounted mirrors and has the earlier chrome rear lights. It also has rear windows which have been simply painted over. The second van, which seems to have only been used in the "Tee Off" Mr. Bean episode, is painted a much darker blue, has no wing mirrors of any kind, the larger late rear lights and also has rear windows which have been painted over; the inside of the doors have also been painted black.

A red Supervan appeared in the S4C Welsh language children's programme Fan Goch.

The 2011 Pixar film Cars 2 features a French character named Tomber who is patterned on a Reliant Regal saloon car, with some creative modifications, such as the headlights of a Citroën Ami. His name means "to fall" in French, referring to the reputed instability of three-wheel vehicles.

A Reliant Regal is shown in the closing ceremony of the 2012 London Olympics with it falling apart and Batman and Robin coming out of it, a plot that appeared in an episode of Only Fools and Horses.

The Only Fools and Horses Reliant Supervan appeared in cartoon form in a short Discovery Channel advert. The cartoon man was driving a sports car and after a short drive, it turned into the Supervan with the announcer saying "What a plonker", albeit quietly, as a reference to Del Boy's famous saying.

In the 2016 Microsoft racing game Forza Horizon 3 which is set in Australia, the 1972 Reliant Supervan III was added to the vehicle roster. The car was again featured in Forza Horizon 4, this time set in the United Kingdom.

In the "They Don't Know" video by Tracey Ullman, love interest Paul McCartney drives a blue Reliant Regal with lettering that spells out "Paul and Tracey" on the windscreen.

In early 2001, rock star Justin Hawkins rode in a 1968 Reliant Regal 3/30 that drove between Las Vegas and San Francisco.

References

External links 

Photographs and data on various Reliant Regal versions
Reliant Regal Supervan III restoration project
Reliant Motor Club

Three-wheeled motor vehicles
Reliant vehicles
Vehicles introduced in 1953